Myristica polyantha is a species of plant in the family Myristicaceae. It is endemic to Papua New Guinea.

References

 World Conservation Monitoring Centre 1998.  Myristica polyantha.   2006 IUCN Red List of Threatened Species.   Downloaded on 22 August 2007.

Flora of Papua New Guinea
polyantha
Vulnerable plants
Taxonomy articles created by Polbot